Megan Sue Kashat (born February 13, 1990), is an American recording artist, songwriter, and dancer of Iraqi descent. She went by the stage name Megyn Hermez from 2010 to 2016. Kashat is best known for her 2011 single "Anxiety", 2013 single "Steal My Crown" and 2018 singles "Waters", "Loyes", "Run" and "Shame".

Early life 
Kashat was born in Novi, Michigan to Kifah and Suhalia Kashat, who emigrated to the United States from Iraq in the 1970s. Her father Kifah owns an auto repair business and her mother Suhalia owns a perfume company. They are of Chaldean descent.

Kashat trained in several forms of dance and music as a child, including ballet, hip-hop, jazz, and tap. She competed in the 2007 Prix De Espana World Cup of Dance in Barcelona, Spain; and took second place. She later trained at the Los Angeles Film School and at the Detroit Institute of Music Education.

Professional career 
Kashat started competing in international dancing competitions at the age of eight. She was formally trained in tap and ballet during those years. Her professional debut was in 2005 when she performed with Mariah Carey at the 2005 NFL Thanksgiving Day Halftime Show in Detroit. That led to appearances on, among others, the Wendy Williams Show, Tom Joyner Fantastic Voyage, Lopez Tonight, and at the 52nd Grammy Awards.

Kashat started her own label, Gypsyland Records in 2013 and released the single "Steal My Crown". The song appeared on Mediabase Hot AC charts for seven straight weeks and received critical acclaim from the industry. Kashat released the singles "Tread The Water" and "Runaway" in 2014. Kashat collaborated with DJ and sound producer RoelBeat and released "Man in the Sky" on May 22, 2018 by Highlimit Records. The song hit No. 12 on Beatport in August 2018.

Personal life 
Kashat is a member of the Church of Scientology.

Discography 
Music is Music (2013)

References 

1990 births
Living people
Songwriters from Michigan
People from Novi, Michigan